This list compiles the names of notable Dutch Euro-Indonesian people, i.e. individuals of mixed Indonesian and European ancestry in the Netherlands and Indonesia (the former Dutch East Indies).

For more context see the article "Indo people".

Music 

 Keren Ann, Dutch-Israeli singer
  aka Tres Manos, guitarist Urban Dance Squad
 Michelle Branch, singer-songwriter
 Patty Brard, singer
 Xander de Buisonjé, singer Volumia!
 Glenn Corneille, musician
 Wieteke van Dort, singer
 DJ Paul Elstak, dj
 Caro Emerald, jazz singer
 George de Fretes, musician
 Anneke Grönloh, singer
 Alex van Halen, drummer Van Halen
 Eddie van Halen, guitarist Van Halen
 Armand Van Helden, DJ
 Andres Holten, singer
 Ernst Jansz, musician, writer Doe Maar
 Jack Jersey, singer
 , singer Loïs Lane
 , singer Loïs Lane
 , musician Kane (Dutch band)
 Jamai Loman, singer, Dutch Idols
 Taco Ockerse, singer, also known as Taco
 , drummer Skybox (Dutch Band), ex-Cat Monkey 
 Abbie de Quant, flutist
 Sandra Reemer, singer
 , rapper
 Ria Thielsch, singer
 Andy Tielman, band/singer Tielman Brothers
 Linda Wagenmakers, musical singer
 Dinand Woesthoff, singer Kane (Dutch band)
 , singer Blue Diamonds
 , singer Blue Diamonds
James Intveld, singer, actor

Literature 

 Marion Bloem, writer (Indo father and mother)
 Louis Couperus (1863–1923), writer
 Theodor Holman, writer
 Victor Ido, writer
 Yvonne Keuls, writer
 Rob Nieuwenhuys, (1908–1999) writer (Dutch father, Indo mother)
 E. du Perron, (1899–1940) writer
 Tjalie Robinson, (1911–1974) writer and activist (Dutch father, Indo mother)
 Beb Vuyk (1905–1991), writer (Indo father, Dutch mother)

Sports 

 Wilfred Bouma, footballer
 Giovanni van Bronckhorst, footballer (Indo father, Moluccan mother)
 Lotte Bruil-Jonathans, badminton player
 Charles van Commenee, athletics
 Sergio van Dijk, footballer
 John Heitinga, footballer
 Jesse Huta Galung, tennis player (Batak father)
 Nigel de Jong, footballer
 Jelle Klaasen, darts player
 Ranomi Kromowidjojo, swimmer (Javanese father from Suriname, Dutch mother)
 Denny Landzaat, footballer
 Roy Makaay, footballer
 Judith Meulendijks, badminton player
 Michael Mols, footballer
 Jason Oost, footballer
 Bobby Petta, footballer
 Paatje Phefferkorn, pencak silat master
 Jaïro Riedewald, footballer
 Manuel Schenkhuizen, professional StarCraft II player
 Sonny Silooy, footballer
 Ferry Sonneville, badminton player
 Nyck de Vries, racing driver
 Demy de Zeeuw, footballer

Politics 

 P.F.Dahler, politician and activist
 Dick de Hoog, politician
 Ernest Douwes Dekker, politician and activist
 Loa Sek Hie, colonial politician, community leader and landlord
 Winnie Sorgdrager, politician
 Geert Wilders, politician
 Thierry Baudet, politician
 Karel Zaalberg (1873-1928), journalist, politician

Film and television 

 Kim Feenstra, model, TV personality
 Laura Gemser (1950-), actress (immigrated to Italy)
 Mark-Paul Gosselaar, actor
 Sylvie Meis (formerly van der Vaart), TV presenter, model (Indo father, Dutch mother)
 Georgina Verbaan (1979-), actress

Arts 

 Johannes Evert Hendrik Akkeringa (1861–1942), painter
 Eppo Doeve, painter
 Charley Toorop (1891-1951), artist
 Jan Toorop (1858-1928), painter

Military 

 Gerardus Johannes Berenschot (1887-1941), KNIL general and commander in chief
 Gotfried Coenraad Ernst van Daalen (1863-1930), KNIL general and commander in chief
 Giovanni Narcis Hakkenberg (1923-2013), decorated war hero, Knight 4th Class of the William Order
 Jacob Pieter van Helsdingen (1907-1942), decorated war hero, Knight 3rd Class of the William Order

Miscellaneous 

 Carel Birnie, co-founder Dutch Dance Theatre
 Louis Grondijs (1878-1961), academic and war correspondent
 Vic Hayes, engineer
 Jan Hilgers (1886-1945), aviator
 Emile Ratelband, guru, politician
 Ian Messing, CET, Crew Chief, Inspector 
Indos
 
Ethnic groups in the Netherlands
Indo people
Indo